Public Forum debate is a widespread form of middle and high school competitive debate which centers on current events and relies on both logic and evidence to construct arguments. Invented in the US, Public Forum is one of the most prominent American debate events, alongside policy debate and Lincoln-Douglas debate; it is also practiced in China and India, and has been recently introduced to Romania. Individuals give short (2-4 minute) speeches that are interspersed with 3 minute "Crossfire" sections, questions and answers between opposed debaters. The winner is determined by a judge who also serves as a referee (timing sections, penalizing incivility, etc). The debate centers on advocating or rejecting a position, "resolve", or "resolution", which is usually a proposal of a potential solution to a current events issue. Public Forum is designed to be accessible to the average citizen.

History 
Public Forum debate was invented in 2002. It was initially called "Ted Turner Debate" for CNN founder Ted Turner. The "crossfire" period of PF is modeled after Crossfire (U.S. TV program), a political debate show on CNN.

Comparisons to other debate forms 
Public Forum debate is often described as more accessible than policy debate. Unlike policy, which has one topic per year, PF debate topics switch every month or every two months and are based on current events. In policy debate, participants tend to "spread", or speak very fast, something that is less common in PF, making PF more understandable to the average "lay", or non-debating person.

Lincoln-Douglas debate tends to focus on philosophical questions, in contrast to PF.

Parliamentary debate is much less structured than PF, and participants are not made aware of their topics until 15–20 minutes before their round, giving them little time to research, gather evidence, and prepare their arguments. In Public Forum, topics are decided prior the month starting, giving debaters plenty of time to research and prepare.

Debate Structure 
A Public Forum debate consists of 8 speeches and 3 crossfires, each with a time limit.

Constructive Speeches (4 minutes) 
The first speech is pre-written and presents the team's "contentions," arguments either supporting or opposing the resolution. These contentions are backed up by warrants, evidence in the form of quotes or citations from sources.

The two speakers from each team who presented cases then participate in a 3-minute crossfire. The first speaker asks the first question in the crossfire, and the rest of the crossfire consists of each speaker asking their opponent questions.

Refutation Speeches (4 minutes) 
The first refutation speaker refutes the constructive speech for the opposite side (that is, the second constructive speech). Parts of this case are sometimes pre-written and are known as "answers to" (A/2s or ATs) or "blocks".

The second refutation speaker refutes the first constructive speaker, but must also defend the arguments of the second constructive speaker, which have just been refuted by the first refutation speaker.

The two speakers then engage in crossfire.

Summary Speeches (3 minutes) 
The summary speech, given by the 2 constructive speakers, is given to both reinforce arguments and to refute their opponents, as well as to try and tell the judge which points the debate should be judged on. The summary is often referred to as the most important speech. Competitors "weigh" their points in comparison to their opponents to explain why it is more important through the framework of scope, magnitude, prerequisite, etc.)

The summary speeches are followed by the grand crossfire, a crossfire between all speakers.

Final Foci/Focuses (2 minutes) 
The final focus, given by the 2 refutation speakers, is 2 minutes and is used to explain to the judge why the speaker's team should win the debate. Final foci must not bring up new material.

Prep Time 
Prep time differs from tournament to tournament. The most common amounts of prep in a debate are 3 minutes and 4 minutes. This prep time can only be taken in between speeches. Each team may use the other team's prep time for their preparation, however, the time is only taken from the team that decided to take prep time. Though it is not common practice, some national tournaments give teams additional prep time. For example, the Yale Invitational Debate Tournament provides both teams with 4 minutes of prep time.

Topics 
Topics are presented as resolutions, meaning they advocate for solving a problem by the means of a certain position. Resolution options and official topics are released by the National Speech and Debate Association (NSDA) on their website. Competitors are encouraged to focus on the "main issues" of the topic rather than search for obscure arguments. The resolution changes frequently and focuses on current events. Some topics spread the length of two months, while others rotate monthly.

Topics include:
 March 2010 – Affirmative action to promote equal opportunity in the United States is justified.
 September 2011 – The benefits of post-9/11 security measures outweigh the harms to personal freedom.
 December 2015 – On balance, standardized testing is beneficial to K-12 education in the United States.
 February 2016 – The United States federal government should adopt a carbon tax.
 April 2017 – The United States ought to replace the Electoral College with a direct national popular vote.
 January 2018 – Spain should grant Catalonia its independence.
 February 2018 – the United States should abolish the capital gains tax.
 November/December 2018 – the United States federal government should impose price controls on the pharmaceutical industry.
 January 2020 - the United States should end its economic sanctions against Venezuela.
 February 2020 - the United States should replace means-tested welfare programs with a universal basic income. 
 April 2020 - Resolved: The United States should remove nearly all of its military presence in the Arab states of the Persian Gulf.
 Nationals 2020 - On balance, charter schools are beneficial to the quality of education in the United States.
 September/October 2020 - Resolved: The U.S. federal government should enact the Medicare for All Act of 2019.
 November/December 2020 - Resolved: The United States should adopt a declaratory nuclear policy of no first use.
January 2021 - Resolved: The NSA should end its surveillance of U.S. citizens and lawful permanent residents.
February 2021 - Resolved: On balance, the benefits of urbanization in West Africa outweigh the harms.
March 2021 - Resolved: On balance, the benefits of creating the United States Space Force outweigh the harms.
April 2021 - Resolved: The benefits of the International Monetary Fund outweigh the harms.
September/October 2021 - Resolved: The North Atlantic Treaty Organization should substantially increase its defense commitments to the Baltic states.
November/December 2021 - Resolved: Increased United States federal regulation of cryptocurrency transactions and/or assets will produce more benefits than harms.
January 2022 - Resolved: The United States federal government should legalize all illicit drugs.
February 2022 - Resolved: On balance, Turkey's membership is beneficial to the North Atlantic Treaty Organization.
March 2022 -  Resolved: In the United States, the benefits of increasing organic agriculture outweigh the harms.
April 2022 - Resolved: Japan should revise Article 9 of its Constitution to develop offensive military capabilities.
 Nationals 2022 - Resolved: The United States should establish a comprehensive bilateral trade agreement with Taiwan.
 September/October 2022 - Resolved: The United States Federal Government should substantially increase its investment in high-speed rail.
 November/December 2022 - Resolved: The United States’ strategy of Great Power Competition produces more benefits than harms.
 January 2023 - Resolved: The United States Federal Government should increase its diplomatic efforts to peacefully resolve internal armed conflicts in West Asia.
February 2023 - Resolved: In the United States, right-to-work laws do more harm than good.
March 2023 - Resolved: The Republic of India should sign the Artemis Accords.
April 2023 - Resolved: The United States Federal Government should ban the collection of personal data through biometric recognition technology.

References 

Debate types
Debating competitions